Dubai Design Week is an annual event held to celebrate and promote design and creativity in Dubai, United Arab Emirates. The first Dubai Design Week took place in 2015, and is held annually at venues across the city, with Dubai Design District being the main hub. With an extensive programme of free-to-attend exhibitions, talks, workshops, the 2019 festival attracted over 90,000 visitors and as such it is considered the largest creative festival in the Middle East.

Providing a meeting point for the global design community, Dubai Design Week represents the region's design talent while engaging with the growing design and creative community in Dubai and the UAE. More information is available on the Dubai Design Week Website and social media channels including Instagram and Facebook.

The last edition of Dubai Design Week took place from 8–13 November 2021.

Overview
Dubai Design Week is owned and managed by the Art Dubai Group (ADG). Held under the patronage of Sheikha Latifa bint Mohammed bin Rashid Al Maktoum, staged in strategic partnership with Dubai Design District, and supported by Dubai Culture and Arts Authority and A.R.M. Holding, it is one of a series of initiatives aimed at developing design and innovation in Dubai by fostering a creative environment.

The six-day event showcases a wide variety of design skills and disciplines including: architecture, product and furniture design, interior design, jewelry, industrial design, service design, technology culture, art, and more. and the programme includes content from over 100 partner organisations.

Dubai Design Week takes place across the city and at its main hub; Dubai Design District (d3), staging activity and events for a wide variety of visitors; from design and architecture professionals through to a dedicated children's programme during the festival's weekend.

Key components of Dubai Design Week include the region's leading fair for high-quality, original design, Downtown Design; Global Grad Show, a year-round programme for graduate students across the world, working on social impact innovation; Abwab, the annually remodelled, interactive platform for creative talent from the Middle East, North Africa and South Asia; alongside an extensive, hybrid talks and workshops programme.

Downtown Design
As the commercial centrepiece of Dubai Design Week - Downtown Design is the leading design trade fair for high-quality, original design in the Middle East for design professionals, showcasing a variety of commercial designs from various industries. It was originally launched in 2013 prior to Dubai Design Week but is now held annually during the week-long festival.

The fair exhibits product launches and latest collections from over 200 international and regional design brands and country pavilions alongside Downtown Editions, the fair's boutique showcase for limited-edition design with a spotlight on designers from the Middle East.

The next edition of Downtown Design will take place from 9–12, 2022.

Global Grad Show
Global Grad Show is a year-round programme for university graduates and professors who are working on solutions for a better world.

It is a platform for promotion, collaboration and development of projects addressing challenges faced by people and communities around the planet, created by academics in the fields of technology, science and design.

The yearly programme includes:

 A collaboration initiative for professors and graduates, to work together across disciplines, institutions and countries on real-world challenges.
 An entrepreneurship route that offers graduates with the opportunity to develop their project towards implementation.
 Held at Dubai Design Week every year is an interactive exhibition of projects from students in top design universities around the world, such as the Royal College of Arts, Keio University and KAIST. The projects are curated based on unique and interesting experiences that range from ultra-technical to incredibly simple.

Introduced in 2020, the second edition of MENA Grad Show brought together social impact innovation projects in the fields of technology, science and design from universities from across the Middle East and North Africa region.

Abwab
Abwab translates as ‘doors’ in Arabic. It is Dubai Design Week's key event for highlighting regional design talent from the Middle East, North Africa and South Asia. The annually remodelled exhibition acts as a snapshot of design activity in the region with a purpose to promote design talent and stimulate information exchange. A total of 180 designers have participated in Abwab from 2015 to 2020.

External links
 Dubai Design Week Official Site
 Downtown Design Official Site
 Global Grad Show Official Site

References

Industrial design
Design events